George Muncy Witt (January 20, 1863 – January 10, 1925) was an American politician in the state of Washington. He served in the Washington House of Representatives from 1895 to 1899.

References

1863 births
1925 deaths
Republican Party members of the Washington House of Representatives